John Fort may refer to:
 John Franklin Fort (1852–1920), American Republican Party politician, Governor of New Jersey 1908–1911
 John Fort (MP), (fl.1830s), English Member of Parliament for Clitheroe 1832–1841
Jack Fort, John Fort, English footballer

See also 
John Forte, comic book artist
John Forté, rapper
Fort John, California